Abdurrahman Gazi was a warrior of Ertuğrul. He also had a military career with Osman I and with his son Orhan Gazi. He was one of the early commanders of the Ottoman Empire, along with the likes of Turgut Alp and Konur Alp. He is famous for this conquest with a story of a Byzantine girl.

Life

Abdurrahman Gazi is believed to have been born near the end of the 12th century, but his place of birth is unknown. He is believed to have been a prominent warrior in the periods of Ertuğrul Gazi, Osman Gazi and Orhan Gazi.

While ,  and Konur Alp, along with other military figures of the Ottoman beylik, were busy with attacks on Akyazı, İznik and İzmit respectively, Abdurrahman Gazi organized raids to the fortresses on the Istanbul side. Until Bursa was conquered, he served as a fighter in the Ottoman-Byzantine border area.

In 1328, Abdurrahman Gazi was sent by Orhan Gazi to besiege Aydos Castle, a prolonged conquest. The castle was allegedly conquered after the Tekfur's daughter experienced a dream of Abdurrahman saving her, prompting her to help Abdurrahman seize the castle, betraying her father.

After the conquest, Abdurrahman is said by historian Halil İnalcık to have married the Tekfur's daughter on Orhan Bey's request, and to have had a son with her.

Death and burial
Abdurrahman Gazi is believed to have died in 1329 in unknown circumstances. He is buried in Abdurrahmangazi village near Eskişehir, in Samandıra, near Istanbul.

In popular culture

Abudurrahman Gazi has been portrayed in the Turkish television series  (1988), and by the Turkish actor Celal Al in Diriliş: Ertuğrul (2014—2019) and Kuruluş: Osman (2019—present).

See also
Rise of the Ottoman Empire
Köse Mihal
Dündar Bey

References 

1329 deaths
14th-century Ottoman military personnel